is a Japanese cross-country skier. He competed at the 1960 Winter Olympics, the 1964 Winter Olympics and the 1968 Winter Olympics.

References

1937 births
Living people
Japanese male cross-country skiers
Japanese male Nordic combined skiers
Olympic cross-country skiers of Japan
Olympic Nordic combined skiers of Japan
Cross-country skiers at the 1960 Winter Olympics
Nordic combined skiers at the 1960 Winter Olympics
Nordic combined skiers at the 1964 Winter Olympics
Nordic combined skiers at the 1968 Winter Olympics
Sportspeople from Hokkaido
20th-century Japanese people